Cortixa is a monotypic moth genus in the family Geometridae. Its only species, Cortixa aurudaria, is found in Peru. Both the genus and species were first described by Schaus in 1901.

References

Oenochrominae
Monotypic moth genera